In the prehistory of the Indian subcontinent, the Iron Age succeeded Bronze Age India and partly corresponds with the megalithic cultures of India. Other Iron Age archaeological cultures of India were the Painted Grey Ware culture (1300–300 BCE) and the Northern Black Polished Ware (700–200 BCE). This corresponds to the transition of the Janapadas or principalities of the Vedic period to the sixteen Mahajanapadas or region-states of the early historic period, culminating in the emergence of the Maurya Empire towards the end of the period.

The earliest evidence of iron smelting predates the emergence of the Iron Age proper by several centuries.

North India
R. Tewari (2003) radiocarbon dated iron artefacts in Uttar Pradesh, including furnaces, tuyeres, and slag between c. 1800 and 1000 BCE. The use of iron and iron working was prevalent in the Central Ganga Plain and the Eastern Vindhyas from the early second millennium BCE. The beginning of the use of iron has been traditionally associated with the eastward migration of the later Vedic people, who are also considered as an agency which revolutionised material culture particularly in eastern Uttar Pradesh and Bihar. Scholar Rakesh Tewari states that new finds and their dates suggest the need for a fresh review. According to him, the evidence corroborates the early use of iron in other areas of the country, and attests that India was indeed an independent centre for the development of the working of iron.

South India
The earliest Iron Age sites in South India are Hallur, Karnataka and Adichanallur, Tamil Nadu at around 1000 BCE. Mahurjhari near Nagpur was a large bead manufacturing site.

See also
Stone Age
Indus Valley Civilisation
Vedic period
History of India
Bharata Khanda
Mahajanapadas

References

Further reading
Kenoyer, J.M. 1998 Ancient Cities of the Indus Valley Civilization. Oxford University Press and American Institute of Pakistan Studies, Karachi.
Kenoyer, J. M. 1991a The Indus Valley Tradition of Pakistan and Western India. In Journal of World Prehistory 5(4): 331-385.
Kenoyer, J. M. 1995a Interaction Systems, Specialized Crafts and Culture Change: The Indus Valley Tradition and the Indo-Gangetic Tradition in South Asia. In The Indo-Aryans of Ancient South Asia: Language, Material Culture and Ethnicity, edited by G. Erdosy, pp. 213–257. Berlin, W. DeGruyter.
Shaffer, J. G. 1992 The Indus Valley, Baluchistan and Helmand Traditions: Neolithic Through Bronze Age. In Chronologies in Old World Archaeology (3rd Edition), edited by R. Ehrich, pp. 441–464. Chicago, University of Chicago Press.
Chakrabarti, D.K.
 1974. Beginning of Iron in India: Problem Reconsidered, in A.K. Ghosh (ed.), Perspectives in Palaeoanthropology: 345-356. Calcutta: Firma K.L. Mukhopadhyay.
 1976. The Beginning of Iron in India. Antiquity 4: 114-124.
 1992. The Early Use of Iron in India. Delhi: Oxford University Press.
 1999. India An Archaeological History. Delhi: Oxford University Press.
 

India
Ancient India
Prehistoric India
Iron Age
History of India
India